The British Wildlife Centre is a zoo in the hamlet of Newchapel near Lingfield village in the county of Surrey, South East England.

The zoo was founded in 1997 by David Mills, who converted his dairy farm into a centre to celebrate British wildlife. Initially, the centre was only open to pre-booked groups but in 2000 it opened fully to the general public.

The animals
There are approximately 40 species of British wildlife kept at the centre, such as red deer, roe deer, red foxes, weasels, badgers, river otters, hedgehogs, Scottish wildcats, and many more.

Conservation
The British Wildlife Centre claims to educate and encourage others to participate in wildlife conservation activities and participate in captive breeding programmes.

Various animals are fed throughout the day, and regular keeper talks are held at these times. The talks are at approximately 30-minute intervals, with some of the morning talks being repeated in the afternoon.

References

Tourist attractions in Surrey
Zoos in England